is a railway station on the Kagoshima Main Line in Moji-ku, Kitakyushu, Japan, operated by Kyushu Railway Company (JR Kyushu).

Lines

Station layout
Komorie Station has two side platforms serving two tracks. The station is unmanned.

Platforms

History
The station opened on 13 March 1988.

Surrounding area
  National Route 3
  National Route 199
 Moji Hospital

See also
 List of railway stations in Japan

References

External links

  

Railway stations in Fukuoka Prefecture
Buildings and structures in Kitakyushu
Kagoshima Main Line
Stations of Kyushu Railway Company
Railway stations in Japan opened in 1988